The 2022–23 Indiana Hoosiers men's basketball team represented Indiana University in the 2022–23 NCAA Division I men's basketball season. They were led by second-year head coach, and former Indiana standout, Mike Woodson. The team played its home games at Simon Skjodt Assembly Hall in Bloomington, Indiana, as a member of the Big Ten Conference. The season officially began with the annual event, Hoosier Hysteria (this year featuring G Herbo), on Friday, October 7, 2022.

The Hoosiers finished the regular season ranked No. 19 in the Associated Press poll. The team spent 15 weeks among the top-25 teams in the nation. The Hoosiers also captured a share of 2nd place in the Big Ten Conference with a 21-10 overall regular season record, 12-8 in Big Ten play, and the No. 3 seed in the Big Ten Conference tournament. IU advanced to the semifinals before losing a close game to Penn State. For the second year in a row, the team found themselves in the NCAA Tournament this time as a No. 4 seed, where they improved upon their performance last year by making it to the Round of 32 but falling to the No. 5 seed Miami (FL), 69-85.

Previous season
The Hoosiers saw a list of streaks come to an end for the program. They finished the season 21–14 overall, and 9–11 in conference play. Along the way, IU ended losing streaks to Purdue, Michigan, and Illinois. As the #9 seed, they also advanced to the semifinals of the Big Ten Conference tournament, something they hadn't done since 2013. They lost to Iowa, 77–80, the eventual tournament champions. The Hoosiers also heard their name called on Selection Sunday for the first time since 2016. After a six-year absence from the NCAA tournament, IU was selected as a #12 seed to play in the NCAA tournament First Four round in Dayton, Ohio. They knocked off Wyoming to make it to the first round (round of 64) where they lost to #5 seed Saint Mary's.

Offseason

Coaching changes 
On March 23, 2022, Coach Woodson announced that assistant coach Dane Fife would not be retained for a second season. In his official statement, Woodson claimed, "Ultimately, I believe that the fit must be right with a coaching staff, and I’ve decided that a change is necessary. I appreciate everything Dane has done as a member of the staff during the last year and as player for our program. He will always be a part of the Hoosier family and I wish him well in his future pursuits."

News broke on March 25 that assistant coaches Kenya Hunter and Yasir Rosemond were promoted to associate head coaches, as well as Brian Walsh from Team and Recruiting Coordinator to assistant coach.

Coach Woodson announced new staff additions on May 9, 2022 of Steven Surface as the Director of Basketball Operations, replacing Benny Sander, and former IU basketball standout Jordan Hulls as the new Team and Recruiting Coordinator, filling the vacant spot left with the promotion of Walsh.

Departures 
On April 9, 2022, Trayce Jackson-Davis announced that he would declare for the 2022 NBA draft, while still keeping his college eligibility. Jackson-Davis announced on May 20, 2022 via Twitter that he was withdrawing from the Draft and would return to IU for a fourth year.

Recruiting classes

2022 recruiting class

2023 recruiting class

Roster 
Note: Players' year is based on remaining eligibility. The NCAA did not count the 2020–21 season towards eligibility.

Schedule and results

|-
!colspan=12 style=| Exhibition

|-
!colspan=12 style=| Regular Season

|-
!colspan=12 style=| Big Ten Tournament

|-
!colspan=12 style=| NCAA Tournament

Player statistics

Rankings

*AP does not release post-NCAA Tournament rankings.

Awards and honors

Pre-season awards

In-season awards

Post-season awards

References

Indiana Hoosiers men's basketball seasons
Indiana
Indiana
Indiana
Indiana